The Espírito Santo gubernatorial election was held on 5 October 2014 to elect the Governor of the state of Espírito Santo.  Governor Renato Casagrande lost a bid for a second term to former Governor Paulo Hartung.

Candidates
Roberto Carlos 13 (PT) - State Deputy for Espírito Santo (elected in 2010); former Councillor for Serra (elected in 2004, 2008)
Celia Tavares 13 (PT) - University Professor
Paulo Hartung 15 (PMDB) - Former Governor of Espírito Santo (elected in 2002, 2006)
César Colnago 15 (PSDB) - Federal Deputy for Espírito Santo (elected in 2010)
Mauro Ribeiro 21 (PCB) - CETURB Employees Association President
Aurelio Carlos 21 (PCB) - Journalist
Renato Casagrande 40 (PSB) - incumbent Governor (elected in 2010)
Fabrício Gandini 40 (PPS) - President, Vitória City Council (2013/2014); Vitória City Councilmember (elected in 2008, 2012)
Camila Valadão 50 (PSOL) - Social worker and activist
Wilson Junior 50 (PSOL) - Educator

Coalitions

Opinion Polling

Results

References

2014 Brazilian gubernatorial elections
2014
October 2014 events in South America